The 2014 Prague Open was a professional tennis tournament played on clay courts. It was the 1st edition of the tournament which was part of the 2014 ATP Challenger Tour. It took place in Prague, Czech Republic between 9 and 15 June 2014.

Singles main-draw entrants

Seeds

 1 Rankings are as of May 26, 2014.

Other entrants
The following players received wildcards into the singles main draw:
  Jakub Filipsky
  Adam Pavlásek
  Lukáš Rosol
  Pavel Staubert

The following players received entry from the qualifying draw:
  Alessandro Giannessi
  Marek Michalička
  Roberto Marcora
  Michael Lammer

Doubles main-draw entrants

Seeds

1 Rankings as of May 26, 2014.

Other entrants
The following pairs received wildcards into the doubles main draw:
  Marek Jaloviec /  Daniel Knoflicek
  Jakub Filipsky /  Pavel Staubert
  Tomáš Papik /  Patrik Rikl

Champions

Singles

 Lukáš Rosol def.  Jiří Veselý, 3–6, 6–4, 6–4

Doubles

 Roman Jebavý /  Jiří Veselý def.  Lee Hsin-han /  Zhang Ze, 6–1, 6–3

External links
Official Website

Prague Open
Prague Open
2014 in Czech tennis